"Counting Down the Days" is the second and final single from Australian singer Natalie Imbruglia's third album, Counting Down the Days (2005). The song reached number 23 in the UK and number 52 in Australia. There are two versions of the song: the first one is the album version found on Counting Down the Days, while the second one is the single version found on the CD single. The main difference between the single and album versions is that the single version does not have a pre-chorus.

The song's lyrics were inspired by Imbruglia's relationship with then-husband Daniel Johns, and the yearning she felt for him while their respective work commitments separated them. They would eventually divorce in early 2008. Johns produced the song.

Track listings
Australian CD single
 "Counting Down the Days"  – 3:09
 "What's the Good in Goodbye"  – 3:57
 "Counting Down the Days"  – 4:09
 "Counting Down the Days" (video)

UK CD1 and European CD single
 "Counting Down the Days"  – 3:09
 "Only You"  – 3:32

UK CD2
 "Counting Down the Days"  – 3:09
 "What's the Good in Goodbye"  – 3:57
 "Counting Down the Days" (video)

Charts

Weekly charts

Year-end charts

Release history

References

2005 singles
2005 songs
Natalie Imbruglia songs
Songs written by Matt Prime
Songs written by Natalie Imbruglia